Terinos clarissa is an Indomalayan  is a butterfly of the family Nymphalidae (Heliconiinae). The larva feeds on Homalium, Rinorea.

Subspecies
 T. c. clarissa (Sumatra, Borneo, Malaya)
 T. c. malayana Fruhstorfer, 1906 (Malaya)
 T. c. dinnaga Fruhstorfer, 1906  (Sumatra)
 T. c. aurensis Eliot, 1978 (Pulau Aur)
 T. c. nympha Wallace, 1869 (Borneo)
 T. c. bangueyana Fruhstorfer, 1912 (Banggi, Bangquey Island)
 T. c. lucia Staudinger, 1889 (Palawan)
 T. c. luciella Fruhstorfer, 1912 (Balabac Island)
 T. c. lucilla Butler, 1870 (Philippines: Mindanao)
 T. c. ludmilla Staudinger, 1898 (Sanghie)

References

Terinos
Butterflies described in 1836
Taxa named by Jean Baptiste Boisduval
Butterflies of Asia